The President's House was built in 1868.  It is on the campus of Gallaudet University in Washington, D.C.  On campus, it is known as the Edward Miner Gallaudet Residence, after the university's first president, who was the first to occupy the house.  More popularly, it is known as House One.  It is a 35-room High Victorian Gothic mansion.

It was listed on the National Register of Historic Places in 1974.

See also
Gallaudet College Historic District

References

Houses on the National Register of Historic Places in Washington, D.C.
Gothic Revival architecture in Washington, D.C.
Houses completed in 1867
Victorian architecture in Washington, D.C.
Frederick Clarke Withers buildings